Raise the Curtain is the debut solo release by American musician Jon Oliva. It was released in June 2013.

Track listing

Personnel
Jon Oliva – lead vocals, piano, guitars, keyboards, drums, bass
Christopher Kinder – drums, percussion, backing vocals
Dan Fasciano – piano, keyboards
Howard Helm – keyboards
Jim Morris, Laurian Mohai, Dana Piper, Dave Kaminsky – guitars
Jon Tucker – saxophone
Jordan Craig, Derek Blankenship, Riley Sulick – horns

References

2013 albums
AFM Records albums